Magnar Ødegaard (born 11 May 1993) is a Norwegian footballer who plays for Sarpsborg 08 as a centre back.

Club career
Ødegaard was born in Fredrikstad and played for Skjeberg SK and Borgen IL during his youth. He later joined Sarpsborg 08, where he made his debut for the first-team in the 2009 Norwegian First Division. He was wanted by Italian club Brescia in June 2010, but Sarpsborg 08 did not give Ødegaard permission to go on a trial mid-season.

Following Sarpsborg 08's promotion to Tippeligaen Ødegaard made his debut in at the first tier on 3 April 2011, when Sarpsborg 08 won 1–0 against Sogndal. In total Ødegaard played 19 matches in the 2011 Norwegian Premier League, when Sarpsborg 08 was relegated. Ødegaard stayed at the club after their relegation to the First Division, and the centre back was chosen by Norwegian TV2 in their  "all-star team" half-way through the 2012 season. In July 2012 Ødegaard stated that he would not renew his contract with Sarpsborg 08 which expired at the end of the 2012 season, and said that one of the reason was that he wanted to join a fully professional club. On 12 August 2012 it was announced that Ødegaard had joined Molde for an undisclosed fee, reported by VG to be 500,000 NOK. Ødegaard, who signed a 3,5-year contract with the club, was brought to Molde as a back-up for the centre-backs Vegard Forren and Even Hovland, and to play for Molde's U19-team in the NextGen Series. Ødegaard made his debut for Molde when he replaced Martin Linnes after 67 minutes in the 3–2 victory against Sandnes Ulf on 7 October 2012.

On 15 January 2019, Magnar started a trial period with Bulgarian team Levski Sofia, after leaving Tromsø after his contract expired.

AIK

On 14 February 2019 it was announced Ødegaard had signed a deal with AIK until 31 July 2019, with an option to extend a further 3.5 years. On 1 July 2019, AIK announced that the club would not exercise its option to extend Ødegaard's contract. Ødegaard appeared in 3 Svenska Cupen games for AIK but made no league appearances.

International career
Ødegaard have represented Norway at youth international level on every level from Under-15 to Under-19. He was first called up to the Under-19 team in January 2011 along with his team-mate Hugues Wembangomo, and made his debut for Norway U19 on 8 February 2011 against Sweden U19. In the match against Ukraine U19 on 25 April 2012, Ødegaard scored the equalizing goal from a free-kick. Ødegaard has been captain of the Under-19 team, and in June 2012 he was called up for Norway U21 squad against Azerbaijan U21, but did not play the match. On 14 August 2012, he made his debut for the Under-21 team when he replaced Omar Elabdellaoui after 83 minutes in the friendly match against Austria U21.

Career statistics

References

1993 births
Living people
Norwegian footballers
Norway under-21 international footballers
Norway youth international footballers
Association football defenders
Sarpsborg 08 FF players
Molde FK players
Lillestrøm SK players
Tromsø IL players
AIK Fotboll players
Norwegian First Division players
Eliteserien players
Norwegian expatriate footballers
Expatriate footballers in Sweden
Sportspeople from Fredrikstad